Madis Kalmet (born 27 January 1955, in Tallinn) is an Estonian actor and theatre director.

In 1980 he graduated from the Tallinn State Conservatory's Stage Art Department. 1980-1985 he was an actor, and 1985-1988 principal stage manager of Rakvere Theatre. 1989-1992 he was an actor, and 1992-1999 the theatre director of Endla Theatre.

Besides stage roles he has also participated on several films.

Kalmet is married to diplomat and former actress Gita Kalmet (née Ränk). Their sons Henrik Kalmet and Karl-Andreas Kalmet are also actors.

Awards:
 1988: Ants Lauter prize
 2019: Order of the White Star, IV class.

Selected filmography

 Metskapten (1971)
 Võõra nime all (1985)
 Ma pole turist, ma elan siin (1989)
 Regina (1990)
 Wikmani poisid (1995)
 Stiilipidu (2005)

References

Living people
1955 births
Estonian male stage actors
Estonian male film actors
Estonian male television actors
20th-century Estonian male actors
21st-century Estonian male actors
Estonian theatre directors
Recipients of the Order of the White Star, 4th Class
Estonian Academy of Music and Theatre alumni
Male actors from Tallinn